Kondylis may refer to:

 Costas Kondylis (1940-2018), American architect
 Georgios Kondylis (1878–1936), general and Prime Minister of Greece
 Panagiotis Kondylis (1943–1998), Greek philosopher, intellectual historian, translator and publications manager

Greek-language surnames
Surnames